AlliedWare Plus is a fully featured Layer 3 operating system developed by Allied Telesis, used on its high-end enterprise network switches, and is the successor to AlliedWare. It is a package encompassing CLI and GUI management, routing, switching and internetworking functionality into a multitasking operating system for IPv4 and IPv6 Ethernet networks. It offers many standards-based features and protocols along with some proprietary technologies such as VCStack for highly resilient stacking solutions, EPSRing for resilient ring topologies, AMF for simplified network management, and Active Fiber Monitoring for secure fiber links.

Interface
AlliedWare Plus' primary interface is its industry-standard CLI. Designed to be similar to other vendor network device CLI's, it is based on a fixed set of multiple-word commands, with the "mode" the user is in defining which of these commands are available. All commands are assigned a default privilege level, with configuration commands requiring the user to enter a higher mode (higher privilege level) than information commands.

It also features a web-based GUI.

Versioning
AlliedWare Plus uses a numerical release versioning structure, formatted as a.b.c-d.e. The first number represents the primary software version, with the second and third numbers representing the major software release. The last two numbers represent the minor and maintenance updates release, respectively. Major and minor releases typically introduce new features or product support, while maintenance releases are usually bug fixes. For example, when this article was first written, the current AW+ software version was 5.4.4-2.3.

Products supporting AlliedWare Plus
 AR3050S and AR4050S Next-Generation Firewalls
 AR2010V and AR2050V Secure VPN Routers
 CentreCOM XS900MX Series
 CentreCom GS900MX/MPX Series
 CentreCom GS980MX Series
 CentreCom GS980M Series
 CentreCom GS980EM Series
 CentreCOM GS970M Series
 CentreCOM GS970EMX Series
 CentreCOM FS980M Series
 x210 Series
 x220 Series
 x230 Series
 x310 Series
 x320 Series
 x330 Series
 x510 Series
 x530 Series
 x530L Series
 x550 Series
 x600 Series
 x610 Series
 x900 Series
 x930 Series
 x950 Series
 SwitchBlade x908
 SwitchBlade x908 GEN2
 SwitchBlade x8100 Series
 IE200 Series (Industrial Switch)
 IE300 Series
 IE500 Series
 IX5-28GPX
 DC2552XS/L3
 AMF Cloud

See also
 Allied Telesis

References

External links
 Official website

Network operating systems
Embedded operating systems